Commander Basil John Douglas Guy  (9 May 1882 – 29 December 1956) was an English recipient of the Victoria Cross, the highest award for gallantry in the face of the enemy that can be awarded to British and Commonwealth forces.

Early life
Guy was educated at Aysgarth School.

Details
He was 18 years old, and a midshipman in the Royal Navy serving at  during the Boxer Rebellion in China, when the following deed took place for which he was awarded the VC:

Guy was invested with the decoration by King Edward VII on 8 March 1902, during a royal visit to Devonport Royal Dockyard.

He was promoted to sub-lieutenant, and on 31 December 1902 was posted to the destroyer HMS Zephyr, serving in home waters.

Further information
He later achieved the rank of commander having fought in the First World War. His VC is on display at the Lord Ashcroft Gallery in the Imperial War Museum, London.

References

External links
Location of grave and VC medal (Surrey)

1882 births
1956 deaths
British recipients of the Victoria Cross
Companions of the Distinguished Service Order
People from Bishop Auckland
Royal Navy officers
Royal Navy officers of World War I
Royal Navy personnel of the Boxer Rebellion
Royal Navy recipients of the Victoria Cross
Military personnel from County Durham
People educated at Aysgarth School